Blue Light (foaled 1958 in Ontario) was a Canadian Thoroughbred racehorse.

Background
Blue Light was a bay horse bred in Ontario by E. P. Taylor. He was sired by Canadian Horse Racing Hall of Fame inductee, Chop Chop. His dam, Blen Lark, was a daughter of Blenheim, the 1930 Epsom Derby winner and Leading sire in North America in 1941. Blue Light was purchased and raced by eighty-one-year-old Col. Kenric R. Marshall, a decorated World War I soldier who later commanded the 48th Highlanders of Canada, who was a highly successful businessman. A long time participant in the Canadian racing industry, Marshall served as Chairman of the Ontario Jockey Club and  owned 1957 Canadian Horse of the Year, Hartney.

Racing career
Blue Light showed little promise as a two-year-old in 1960 but who won the 1961 Queen's Plate, Canada's most prestigious race and North America's oldest annually run stakes race.

Pedigree

References

 Blue Light's pedigree and partial racing stats
 Cauz, Louis E. The Plate (1984) Deneau Publishers  
 June 19, 1961 Ottawa Citizen article on Blue Light winning the Queen's Plate

1958 racehorse births
Racehorses bred in Ontario
Racehorses trained in Canada
King's Plate winners
Thoroughbred family 9-c